Mordellistena microgemellata is a species of beetle in the genus Mordellistena of the family Mordellidae, which is part of the superfamily Tenebrionoidea. It was discovered in 1965 and lives in such countries as Bulgaria, Greece and Cyprus.

References

Beetles described in 1965
microgemellata
Beetles of Europe